The 2021 Prada Challenger's Trophy was a sailing competition held to determine the challenger in the 2021 America's Cup who would challenge Emirates Team New Zealand. The races were held from January 15 to February 21, 2021 in Auckland, New Zealand and were preceded by the 2019–20 America's Cup World Series.  Veteran sailor Iain Murray served again as race director. The team Luna Rossa Prada Pirelli beat Ineos Team UK 7-1 in the final moving onto the 2021 America's Cup.

Teams

Three teams that competed for the title of challenger against defender Team New Zealand in the 2021 America's Cup.

Rules

Boats
The Cup is sailed in AC75s, 75 foot foiling monohulls. The boats are expected to have requirements around the boats being "constructed in country". Teams are allowed to build two boats each.

Nationality
Twenty percent of sailors in each team must have passports from that country. The rest must meet a residency requirement: they must reside in that team's country for 380 days from 1 September 2018 to 1 September 2020.

Competition format
The Prada Cup uses a quadruple Round-robin tournament to determine a seeding. The second and third seeds after all twelve races then compete in a seven-race series in order to advance to a 13-race final series against the first seed from the round robin. The winner of this final series will become the challenger for the 2021 America's Cup against defender Team New Zealand.

Round Robin
The triple round-robin series was held on the 15th till the 23rd of January. The UK was undefeated and therefore qualified directly for the final. America lost twice to each of the other competitors, and then in their fourth race the American team capsized and caused significant damage to the boat — forcing their withdrawal from the remaining races in the round-robin while they undertook repairs. Italy, having lost all their races against UK but won all the races against the USA, came second. This forced the USA and Italy to the semif-final knockout series, and the right to challenge the UK again in the final.

Round Robin 1 (January 15–16)

Notes:
 Luna Rossa Prada Pirelli filed an official Claim of Non-Compliance (‘CNC’) against Ineos Team UK for use of a mainsail during Race 1 and Race 2 with an intentional opening in the skin in order to run a outhaul line through the opening, then covering up the hole with fabric so no air can pass through. The race committee inspected the mainsail and determined that the feature is an intentional opening through the sail skin that is not covered or closed whilst racing, but "determined that this non-compliance with the AC75 Class Rule has not (or could not reasonably be expected to have) improved the performance of the yacht or has not (or could not reasonably be expected to have) had a significant effect on the outcome of a race." Ineos Team UK was fined $5,000 USD, to be paid to the Sir Peter Blake Trust.
 Race 3 was shortened from six legs to four mid-race because of light winds.

Round Robin 2 (January 16–17)

Notes:
 Race 2 was abandoned after 4 legs due to a wind shift causing the course to not have a defined upwind and downwind leg. The course was re-set and orientated more towards the west, with the race being re-run from the beginning.
 American Magic capsized while rounding Gate 5 when a gust of wind caught the sails causing the leeward running backstay to not release and preventing the mainsail from being eased. No crew were reported injured but the incident caused a large hole in the hull of the boat and for a time it was at significant risk of sinking. Per race rules, Luna Rossa Prada Pirelli was awarded the victory.

Round Robin 3 (January 22–23)

Notes:
 American Magic announced they would not compete in Round robins 3 and 4 following the damage sustained to their boat Patriot during the capsize in their round robin 2 race. In accordance with the rules, "ghost races" would be held. Those which were to have featured the teams would still take part on time and, given the American team failed to reach the starting gate, the race would then be awarded to the competitor by default.
Race 2 was set for January 22, but due to American Magic withdrawing from Round Robins 3 and 4, the race was moved to January 23.

Round Robin 4 (January 23–24)

Notes
 Since Ineos Team UK has already qualified for the finals, the final races were agreed to not be held after discussions between  Ineos Team UK and Luna Rossa Prada Pirelli. No points are awarded for these races.

Semi-final
The semi-finals were held from 29 January to 2 February 2021. The second and third-placed team from the round-robin competed in a best-of-seven series to determine who would sail in the final against the UK. As the higher seed, Luna Rossa Prada Pirelli chose to have Starboard gate position as their preferred starting mark. They would win the series 4-0, making the USA the first challenger team to be knocked out of the competition.

Notes
 American Magic set a new AC75 speed record of 53.3 knots during race 1, nevertheless Luna Rossa won both first-day races.
 During race 4, American Magic suffered mechanical failure, with the boat's starboard cant arm becoming temporarily stuck in the raised position several times, resulting in significant loss of time and penalties from boundary infringement.

Finals
The Prada Cup final determined the Challenger that will face the Defender Emirates Team New Zealand in the 2021 America's Cup, was raced from 13 to 21 February 2021 in a best-of-13 series.  As the higher seed, Ineos Team UK chose to have Starboard gate position as their preferred starting mark. Coming into the finals, both teams were undefeated in the immediately proceeding series (the semi-finals for Italy, and the round-robins for the UK). Italy would eventually continue this streak by winning the first 5 of the finals races, and eventually the whole series 7-1. 

Notes

 On February 14, after the conclusion of raceday 2 and with the score at 4-0 towards Italy, the New Zealand government announced that there would be in a "level 3" lockdown for at least 72 hours due to COVID-19 precautions across Auckland. This caused the postponement of raceday 3  (originally scheduled to be held on February 17) although teams were permitted to sail during the lockdown.
 Following disagreements between the challenger of record (Luna Rossa) and the America's Cup authorities about how and when to proceed, racing was agreed to resume on February 20 with raceday 3, with some restrictions to accommodate COVID19 Alert Level 2, and subsequent racedays shifted along the calendar by consequence.
In race 8 Luna Rossa was penalised for crossing the starting line early and were required to drop 50m behind Ineos Team UK. Having served their penalty the Italian team retook the lead within the first leg of what became the final race of the series.

See also
Prada Cup
2021 America's Cup
2019–20 America's Cup World Series
Italy at the America's Cup

References

External links

 America's Cup Advanced dashboard of race statistics

Prada Cup
Prada Cup
Prada Cup
Prada Cup
Prada Cup, 2021
Auckland waterfront